Simon Dein is a psychiatrist and anthropologist.  he was visiting professor at Goldsmiths, University of London, a senior lecturer at University College London and an honorary clinical professor at the University of Durham.

Dein is founding editor of the journal Mental Health, Religion & Culture.

References 

British anthropologists
Living people
Year of birth missing (living people)